Cecil Bransky (born 15 May 1942) is a former lawn and indoor international bowler.

Bowls career
Cecil was born in South Africa and reached the 1971 South African National Bowls Championships singles final and one year later went one better by winning it, bowling for Balfour Park, South Transvaal.

Later he moved to Israel and won twelve national titles. He was the 1985 World Indoor Bowls Championship runner up. He won a Gold medal in the triples during the 1992 World Outdoor Bowls Championships. Because he moved to Israel he was able to compete in international competition despite the South African ban during his active years.

In 1993, he won the Hong Kong International Bowls Classic pairs title with Jeff Rabkin.

References

Living people
1942 births
South African male bowls players
Place of birth missing (living people)
Israeli male bowls players
Bowls World Champions